UFC Fight Night: Teixeira vs. Saint Preux (also known as UFC Fight Night 73) was a mixed martial arts event held on August 8, 2015, at Bridgestone Arena in Nashville, Tennessee.

Background
The event was headlined by a light heavyweight bout between former title challenger Glover Teixeira and Tennessee resident Ovince Saint Preux.

Matt Van Buren was briefly linked to a bout with promotional newcomer Jonathan Wilson at the event.  However, Van Buren was removed from the card in early June citing injury and was replaced by Jared Cannonier. In turn, Cannonier was forced to pull out due to injury and was replaced by Chris Dempsey.

Joe Riggs was expected to face Uriah Hall at this event. However, Riggs was forced to pull out due to injury and was replaced by UFC newcomer Oluwale Bamgbose.

Ian McCall was expected to face Dustin Ortiz at this event. However, McCall was forced to pull out of the event due to injury and was replaced by Willie Gates. Gates had previously fought only 27 days before the event, when he defeated Darrell Montague at The Ultimate Fighter 21 Finale.

Ray Borg missed weight on his first attempt at the weigh-ins, coming in at 126.75 lb. After having made no attempts to cut further, he was fined 20 percent of his fight purse, which went to his opponent Geane Herrera.

Results

Bonus awards
The following fighters were awarded $50,000 bonuses:
Fight of the Night: Glover Teixeira vs. Ovince Saint Preux
Performance of the Night: Amanda Nunes and Marlon Vera

See also
List of UFC events
2015 in UFC

References

UFC Fight Night
Events in Nashville, Tennessee
Mixed martial arts in Tennessee
Sports competitions in Nashville, Tennessee
2015 in sports in Tennessee
2015 in mixed martial arts
August 2015 sports events in the United States